Holywell Town railway station was a station in Holywell, Flintshire, Wales. The station was opened on 1 July 1912 and closed on 6 September 1954. There was a single platform with two wooden shelters, a run round loop and extensive goods facilities. The station could be accessed by a sloping path down from a road bridge.  There are no remains of the station today, just the track-bed and elevated goods yard site on the northwest side of the road over bridge.

References

Further reading

Disused railway stations in Flintshire
Railway stations in Great Britain opened in 1912
Railway stations in Great Britain closed in 1954
Former London and North Western Railway stations